Shaheed Sthal metro station, also known as New Bus Adda metro station, is the terminal metro station of the Red Line in the Delhi Metro. It is located in Ghaziabad, Uttar Pradesh. The metro station serves is closest to NH 58 bus station, which carries passengers from Meerut to New Delhi and is also close to Red Mall Cinepolis. It is on the link road which connects NH58 to NH24.

Station layout

See also

References

External links

 Delhi Metro Rail Corporation Ltd. (Official site)
 Delhi Metro Annual Reports
 
 UrbanRail.Net – descriptions of all metro systems in the world, each with a schematic map showing all stations.

Delhi Metro stations
Railway stations in Ghaziabad district, India